Paradoxiconus is a taxon of problematic spine with a smooth tip and a striated and ornamented base, known from phosphatic  fossils from the middle Meishucunian.

References 

Enigmatic prehistoric animal genera
Cambrian animals of Asia
Cambrian China
Fossils of China
Fossil taxa described in 2001

Cambrian genus extinctions